Amirreza Pourramezanali (born September 23, 1992) is an Iranian chess Grandmaster (2016). On the May 2016 FIDE list, he had an Elo rating of 2515.

List of career achievements
Grandmaster since 2016
International Master since 2014
Fide Master since 2010
 2nd Place Young talents Anatoly Karpov Trophy-Cap d'agde France 2017
Participant of Fide Chess World Cup Tbilisi 2017
Champion of Asian Zonal 3.1 Tehran 2017
Bronze Medal With Iranian Team in World Chess University Championship 2016
Bronze Medal With Iranian National Team in Asian Nations Cup 2014
Bronze Medal Asian Youth Championship Under 18
Silver Medal With Iranian Team in Asian Youth Championship
Champion Of Moscow Grandmaster Tournament 2015
Champion Of Tblissi Grandmaster Summer Tournament 2016
Champion Of  6th Lian Open (2014)
Champion Of Ardebil International Blitz Cup 2015
Silver Medal Of Iranian Blitz Championship 2015
Silver medal in Poland Open 2008
Gold medal Iran youth Championship under 14,16,18

References

External links

Iranian chess players
Chess grandmasters
Living people
1992 births
Place of birth missing (living people)